John Grisdale was an Anglican colonial bishop in the late 19th century.

Grisdale was born in Bolton, Lancashire, on 25 June 1845 and educated at the Missionary College in Islington. He was ordained in 1870.

After a year in India as a missionary he emigrated to Canada where he was Rector of Holy Trinity, Winnipeg. He was later Professor of Theology at St John’s College, Winnipeg and then Dean of Rupert's Land before being ordained to the episcopate as the third Bishop of Qu’Appelle. He died on 27 January 1922.

Notes

1845 births
1922 deaths
Clergy from Bolton
Holders of a Lambeth degree
Academic staff of the University of Manitoba
Anglican Church of Canada deans
Anglican bishops of Qu'Appelle
19th-century Anglican Church of Canada bishops
20th-century Anglican Church of Canada bishops